The Buffalo Bandits are a lacrosse team based in Buffalo, New York playing in the National Lacrosse League (NLL). The 2007 season was the franchise's 16th season, and was almost a repeat of their 2006 season. After winning the East with an 11-5 record in 2006, the Bandits finished 2nd with a 10-6 record in 2007. Once again they dispatched Minnesota in the division semi-finals, and once again met Rochester in the division finals. This time however, Rochester would take the division on their way to the Championship, beating the Bandits 14-13 in overtime.

Regular season

Conference standings

Game log
Reference:

Playoffs

Game log
Reference:

Player stats
Reference:

Runners (Top 10)

Note: GP = Games played; G = Goals; A = Assists; Pts = Points; LB = Loose Balls; PIM = Penalty minutes

Goaltenders
Note: GP = Games played; MIN = Minutes; W = Wins; L = Losses; GA = Goals against; Sv% = Save percentage; GAA = Goals against average

Awards

Transactions

Trades

Roster
Reference:

See also
2007 NLL season

References

V

Buffalo